In computer networking, the Tunnel Setup Protocol (TSP) is an experimental networking control protocol used to negotiate IP tunnel setup parameters between a tunnel client host and a tunnel broker server, the tunnel end-points. A major use of TSP is in IPv6 transition mechanisms.

Parameter negotiation
The TSP protocol performs negotiation of the following parameters:
User authentication using the Simple Authentication and Security Layer (SASL) protocol
Tunnel encapsulation for a variety of tunneling scenarios:
IPv6 over IPv4 tunnels
IPv4 over IPv6 tunnels
IPv6 over UDP/IPv4 tunnels for built-in traversal of network address translators (NAT)
IP address assignment for both tunnel endpoints
Domain Name System (DNS) registration of end point addresses and reverse DNS
Tunnel keep-alive mechanism as needed
IPv6 address prefix assignment for routers
Routing protocols

TSP Session
A TSP session is initiated by the TSP client in the goal of establishing an end-to-end tunnel with the TSP server (tunnel broker). The session consists of a basic exchange of XML-encoded data using TCP or UDP. After the negotiation of tunnel setup parameters, the session is terminated and the client undertakes the task of configuring its local tunnel endpoint.

See also
 Anything In Anything (AYIYA)

References

External links
IPv6 TSP Server Implementation

IPv6
Network protocols
Tunneling protocols